The Consunji House is a heritage house in the City of San Fernando, Pampanga province in the Philippines.

History
The house was the residence of Antonio E. Consunji, the gobernadorcillo of San Fernando in 1892.  He was removed from office by the ruling Spanish government because of his attendance when Jose P. Rizal visited the town in June of that year.  He became the presidente municipal of San Fernando during the Philippine Revolution from 1898 to 1899.

References

Buildings and structures in San Fernando, Pampanga
Cultural Properties of the Philippines
Landmarks in the Philippines
Heritage Houses in the Philippines